Moor Park may refer to several places in England:

 Moor Park, Blackpool, a municipal park
 Moor Park, Crosby, a residential area
 Moor Park, Preston, a municipal park and electoral ward
 Moor Park High School
 Moor Park, Hertfordshire, a suburban residential development
 Moor Park (house), the origin of the Moorpark apricot
 Moor Park tube station, a commuter rail station
 Moor Park School, Shropshire, a Catholic preparatory school near Ludlow
 Moor Park, Farnham, Surrey, a house and park
 Moor Park SSSI, a Site of Special Scientific Interest

See also
 Moor Park and Eastbury, a ward in Three Rivers, England
 Moorpark, California, USA
Moore Park (disambiguation)